Chagey is a commune in the Haute-Saône department in the region of Bourgogne-Franche-Comté in eastern France.

Economy
An iron foundry was established early in the nineteenth century to refine the ore from the rich mines near Bethoncourt.

See also
Communes of the Haute-Saône department

References

Communes of Haute-Saône